Cristiana Lobo (born 23 June 1972) is a former synchronized swimmer from Brazil.

References 

1972 births
Living people
Brazilian synchronized swimmers
Olympic synchronized swimmers of Brazil
Synchronized swimmers at the 1992 Summer Olympics